Larry's Hideaway was a bar in the Prince Carlton Hotel in Toronto, Ontario, Canada. The venue was notable for being one of the first venues in Toronto to open itself to punk and new wave music acts, as well as hard rock. The venue was well known for its good acoustics. Several artists recorded live albums at the venue.

Venue
The bar was located in the basement of the Prince Carlton Hotel on the north-west corner of Allan Gardens, on Carlton Street at Jarvis Street. The room was a restaurant prior to 1961, when it became a jazz venue.

Starting in the late 1970s, the venue was booked by the "Two Garys", Gary Topp and Gary Cormier, who also booked bands to "The Edge" venue and to the Horseshoe Tavern. The bar had a dirty, un-clean reputation although bands reputedly loved to play there.

The bar closed in the summer of 1986, but the hotel remained open and was the site of several robberies and sexual assaults. In September 1986, the hotel was raided by the Toronto Police. The police arrested 26 persons and seized thousands of dollars of stolen goods and drugs. The hotel was sold in 1988 and closed. It was boarded up and left vacant, sometimes used by squatters and vagrants. On October 16, 1991, a three-alarm fire destroyed much of the hotel. The City of Toronto government bought it in 1990 to increase the size of Allan Gardens park. The location is now the off-leash dog area of the park.

Notable artists

 Lee Aaron
 Alien Sex Fiend
 Bauhaus
 Billy Bragg
 Blibber and the Rat Crushers
 Black Flag
 Circle Jerks
 HYPE
 Nick Cave and the Bad Seeds
 Chris and Cosey
 Ornette Coleman
 The Cramps
 The Cult
 Dead Beat
 Howard Devoto
 The Diodes
 Einstürzende Neubauten
 The Exploited
 The Fall
 FM
 Goddo
 Hanoi Rocks - First North American performance March 1984
 Nina Hagen
 The Hi-Fi's (early Blue Rodeo)

 John Cale
 Killing Joke
 L'Etranger
 Linton Kwesi Johnson
 The Lords of the New Church
 Max Webster
 R.E.M.
 Random Killing
 Raving Mojos
 Rush
 Slayer
 Sun Ra Arkestra
 Teenage Head
 The Jolly Tambourine Man
 The Tragically Hip
 Triumph
 U.K. Subs
 Vital Sines
 Negative Gain
 HYPE

Live albums
 Killing Joke - Ha!
 R.E.M. - Murmur (Deluxe Edition bonus disc)
 The Viletones - Saturday Night/Sunday Morning
 Discharge - Toronto '83
 HYPE - Live at Larry's Hideaway 1985 (album)
 Bauhaus - In a Glass Haus (1982)

References

Music venues in Toronto